Bian Zhang (died 186), originally named Bian Yun, was an official who lived in the Eastern Han dynasty of China. He served as the Prefect of Xin'an County.<ref>Houhanshu vol. 78.</ref>

In 185, Beigong Boyu of the Qiang tribe rebelled in Liang Province. Beigong Boyu took Bian Zhang and Han Sui, another Han official, hostage and stopped all attempts to return them. Bian Zhang was forced to participate in the rebellion or else he would be killed. He became the overall commander of the rebels, but was defeated in battle with Dong Zhuo and Sun Jian and died of illness shortly after, or according to other sources, killed by Han.

See also
 Lists of people of the Three Kingdoms

 References 

 Fan, Ye (5th century). Book of the Later Han (Houhanshu).
 Sima, Guang (1084). Zizhi Tongjian''.

Han dynasty generals
2nd-century births
186 deaths
Han dynasty people killed in battle